The 1975–76 season was Stoke City's 69th season in the Football League and the 45th in the First Division.

After two very successful league campaigns there was high hopes for the 1975–76 season as Stoke looked to establish themselves amongst the best in the country. Their form was good and going into the new year Stoke were in the top half of the table and looking good. But disaster struck in January 1976 as winds of hurricane force battered Stoke-on-Trent and the Victoria Ground was badly damaged. The roof of the Butler Street stand collapsed and Stoke had to play a league match against Middlesbrough at nearby Vale Park whilst repair work was carried out. Results declined thereafter and Stoke took 12th position.

Season review

League
There had been heavy transfer costs incurred in 1974–75 with the club recording a loss of £448,342 and therefore now in debt despite an increase in the average attendance. Geoff Hurst was sold to West Bromwich Albion for £20,000, the only outgoing transfer for cash in the summer of 1975, although two other notable departures were those of club record goalscorer John Ritchie who retired after finding the back of the net a record 176 times for the "Potters" and also goalkeeper John Farmer. Hopes were high again of a successful season, but Stoke stayed stubbornly in the middle of the division never threatening the top or bottom to the table.

After some good and bad results come January 1976 Stoke experienced perhaps their greatest misfortune. In a powerful storm which hit the Stoke-on-Trent area the Butler Street stand had its roof blown off by strong winds and the Victoria Ground was closed while repair work was carried out. Near neighbours Port Vale offered Stoke the use of Vale Park and on the one occasion they used it Middlesbrough were beaten 1–0 with Ian Moores scoring in front of 21,009. Stoke were allowed back home for their next match against Manchester City in the FA Cup on 4 February. Stoke lost the momentum they had and finished the season in 12th spot. Eric Skeels left the club at the end of the season. Skeels is Stoke's all-time record appearance holder having made 592 appearances for the club in all competitions.

FA Cup
Stoke beat both Tottenham Hotspur and Manchester City before losing to Sunderland in a replay.

League Cup
Fourth Division Lincoln City caused a shock as they beat Stoke 2–1 at Sincil Bank.

Final league table

Results

Stoke's score comes first

Legend

Football League First Division

FA Cup

League Cup

Friendlies

Squad statistics

References

Stoke City F.C. seasons
Stoke